Liaño may refer to:

People
David Liaño Gonzalez (born 1979), Spanish mountaineer
Felipe de Liaño (died 1625), Spanish painter
Francisco Liaño (born 1964), Spanish footballer
Thomas Vásquez de Liaño (1546-1599), Roman Catholic prelate

Places
Liaño, locality in the municipality of Villaescusa in Cantabria, Spain

See also
Liano (disambiguation)
Lianos (disambiguation)